Bohurupee is a Bengali premier theatre group. Bohurupee  was founded in 1948  by several active members who left the Indian People's Theatre Association. The group was created to present the experimental Bengali drama in unusual form.

Early days
After breaking away from Indian People's Theatre Association, prominent Bengali theatre personalities like Sombhu Mitra, Bijon Bhattacharya created Bohurupee in 1948. The group came into prominence as a composite drama form. This period was a period of struggle for Bohurupee. Between 1950 and 1958 they directed multiple important plays. They staged Rabindranath Tagore's play 'Char Adhyay' in 1951. In 1958, they stage another work of Tagore - Raktakaravi. In Putulkhela (1958), which was a depiction of Ibsen's Doll's House, Bohurupee touched a sensitive contemporary issue in bold manner. Dasachakra (1962) was adapted from An Enemy of the People by Henrik Ibsen.

Selected plays

Char Adhyay (1951).
Raktakaravi (1954).
Putulkhela (1958).
Visarjan (1961).
Dasachakra (1962).
Raja Oidipous (1964).
Raja (1964).
Chop! Adalat Cholche (1971).
Dakghar (1973).
Ghare Baire (1974).
Mrichchhakatika (1979).
Galileo (1980).
Rajdarsan (1982).
Aguner pakhi (1984).
Mr. Kakatuya (1987).
Kinu Kaharer Thetar (1988).
Nabanna (1989).

Awards
Airlines Cultural Organisation - Kolkata - Contribution to Bengali Theatre
Anya Theatre - Kolkata - Distinguished Theatre personality Natya Swapnakalpa - 2004
Dishari - Kolkata - Best Actor - Nisiddha Thikana - 2004

See also
Sombhu Mitra
Tripti Mitra
Kumar Roy

References

External links 
 

1948 establishments in West Bengal
Theatre companies in India
Organisations based in Kolkata
Performing groups established in 1948
Bengali theatre groups